Sheetz, Inc. is an American chain of convenience stores and coffee shops owned by the Sheetz family. The stores sell custom food, beverages and convenience store items, with all locations having offered 24/7 service since the 1980s. Nearly all of them sell gasoline; a few locations are full-scale truck stops, including showers and a laundromat. Sheetz's headquarters is in Altoona, Pennsylvania, with stores being located in Central and Western Pennsylvania, West Virginia, Maryland, Ohio, Virginia, and North Carolina, with plans to expand into Michigan. There are currently 675 stores open as of today.

History

1952–1995

Sheetz, Inc. was founded by G. Robert "Bob" Sheetz in 1952 when he purchased one of his father's five dairy stores located in Altoona. In 1961, Bob hired his brother Steve to work part-time.

In 1963, the second store was opened under the name "Sheetz Kwik Shopper." A third store followed in 1968. In 1969, Steve became general manager. The brothers planned to expand at the rate of one store per year with a target of seven stores by 1972. In 1972, the company expanded from seven to fourteen stores. One year later, Sheetz began selling gasoline, and opened the first self-serve gas pumps in central Pennsylvania. The first Sheetz store outside Pennsylvania opened in Maryland in 1976.

In 1981, Bob retired and Steve became president. By 1983, Bob and Steve had opened 100 stores. At that time, the "Kwik Shopper" in "Sheetz Kwik Shopper" was removed.

1995–2013
In 1995, Stanton R. "Stan" Sheetz, Bob's son, became president and Steve assumed the position of chairman of the board. To this day, Sheetz maintains a family business with four family members serving on the executive committee.

During the mid-1990s, It! Cola, the chain's private-label brand of soft drinks was discontinued. It was available in cans, bottles, and as a fountain drink, which was replaced by Pepsi products. The chain now has both Pepsi and Coca-Cola products in its fountains. In 1997 the company resumed store expansion, opening locations in Northeast Ohio. At that time, touchscreen ordering was introduced.

In September 2001, Sheetz opened a distribution center in Claysburg, Pennsylvania. In December 2004, Sheetz began offering their new MasterCard PayPass with RFID technology, and was one of the first retailers to accept such technology, ahead of McDonald's, Arby's, CVS, and rival 7-Eleven, all of which introduced it nationally in 2006.

On July 10, 2006, Sheetz became Pennsylvania's second retail chain to offer E85 ethanol-based fuel alternatives at select stations.

In 2008, Sheetz opened its first commissary, Sheetz Bros. Kitchen, to produce fresh sandwiches and bakery products that are sold at Sheetz locations.

In 2011, Sheetz gained national attention when it served as a major sponsor for Morgan Spurlock's film POM Wonderful Presents: The Greatest Movie Ever Sold. Sheetz actively promoted the film in stores, including selling collector cups, and Altoona even temporarily changed its name to "POM Wonderful Presents: The Greatest Movie Ever Sold, Pennsylvania" for $25,000. The name change was merely ceremonial, as it was not legally changed by the United States Board of Geographic Names, nor was it recognized by the United States Postal Service.

2013–present
In October 2013, Stan Sheetz became chairman of the board of Sheetz, with his cousin Joseph S. "Joe" Sheetz becoming president and CEO.

Published in November 2013, Kenneth Womack's Made to Order: The Sheetz Story traces the company's history from its dairy-store origins through the present day.

In 2014, Sheetz opened its second distribution center and kitchen facility in Burlington, North Carolina.

Sales for fiscal year 2018–2019 totaled $7.5 billion.

On November 29, 2019, Sheetz announced an expansion into Columbus, Ohio starting in 2021. Currently, the major competitors in that area include Speedway, Circle K, GetGo, United Dairy Farmers, and the locally based Duchess Shoppe. Sheetz plans to open 60 locations in the Columbus area by 2025 (more than doubling its current store count in Ohio), with Sheetz COO Travis Sheetz telling The Columbus Dispatch that "we're not coming in lightly". Locations already confirmed will be located in Obetz (near Rickenbacker International Airport), four locations in Columbus proper (including one just outside of John Glenn Columbus International Airport near Gahanna, one in the Northland area of northeast Columbus, and another near Hollywood Casino Columbus and the former Westland Mall), Circleville, South Bloomfield, Polaris, Reynoldsburg, Newark, and two each in Delaware, New Albany and Hilliard; locations in Grove City & Lancaster (the latter due to its close proximity to an existing Sheetz location in Zanesville) are also expected. Another location was planned in Worthington but was shelved due to local resident opposition of the proposed site being next door to a water treatment plant. In January 2021, Sheetz launched a website to prepare for its Columbus launch, with accompanying digital billboards to hype its arrival, while also becoming a presenting sponsor for local CBS affiliate WBNS-TV's newscasts. Upon Sheetz's official arrival in the area with the opening of the first of two stores in Delaware in April 2021, Travis Sheetz said that the company had considered expanding into Columbus as early as the late 1990s when the company first expanded into Northeast Ohio, but decided to expand into North Carolina instead and only recently started expanding into Central Ohio due to many social media requests from transplants now living in the area asking for Sheetz.

On December 19, 2019, Sheetz celebrated the opening of its 600th store in Shaler Township, PA. Sheetz now has more than 600 locations across Pennsylvania, Maryland, Virginia, West Virginia, Ohio and North Carolina, and more than 21,000 employees. All Sheetz stores are company-owned-and-operated. The company has no plans to sell franchises. Sheetz is the dominant convenience store chain in much of Pennsylvania, holding a virtual monopoly in Altoona, although Rutter's moved into the Altoona area in 2017 and now has three locations in Blair County, and a commanding share in Pittsburgh (where it competes with 7-Eleven, Speedway, GetGo, and to a much lesser extent Circle K) and Harrisburg (where it primarily competes with Rutter's, as well as 7-Eleven and Speedway), but is noticeably absent from the Delaware Valley (including Philadelphia) due to the presence of Wawa, leading to a fierce "rivalry" between the two chains among Pennsylvanians, though the two companies themselves have a friendly relationship.

In 2020, Sheetz discontinued selling Faygo soft drinks and replaced them with their new private-label brand, Sheetz Pop!. This drink effectively replaces It! Cola 25 years after the latter product was discontinued.

Following the chain's successful expansion into the Columbus market, in April 2022 Sheetz announced an expansion into the Dayton, Ohio market beginning in 2024. The move will put Sheetz up head-to-head with Casey's for the first time, while also competing with Speedway, Circle K, and UDF in the market. The move will also leave Cincinnati and Toledo as the only major Ohio markets without Sheetz.

On November 29, 2022, Sheetz announced it would expand into Michigan for the first time, beginning with Detroit in 2025. On December 23, 2022, Sheetz announced an expansion into Wilmington, North Carolina.

Food service
In 1986, to boost lagging sales, Earl Springer, the manager of a Sheetz in Williamsport, Maryland, pursued a food concept that would become Sheetz's signature Made To Order (MTO) line. Beginning with only submarine sandwiches, customers would fill out a small slip of paper, designating the ingredients they wanted on their sandwich, and in what quantity. The order slip would be placed in a basket, and the kitchen staff would prepare the sub to the customer's order. Since that time, the menu expanded, and by the 1990s MTO was a sales leader for Sheetz. Beginning in 1996, the paper ordering system was phased out in favor of a picture-based touchscreen computer system. Now common at many restaurants and gas stations worldwide, Sheetz was the first company to implement this technology.

By 1999, Sheetz was selling 10,000 MTO units a day. Sheetz now trains employees to function as baristas for their newest brand of "Sheetz Bros. Coffeez", which are designed to be higher-grade coffee than typically found in convenience stores. With the introduction of the "Convenience Restaurant" concept, they have expanded their menu. Customers can purchase a wide variety of food items. The Espresso Bar, offering specialty coffees, is found at all locations. Sheetz regularly offers customers free coffee on Christmas Day and New Year's Day. During 2008–2009, Sheetz rolled out "MTGo!", a grab and go assortment of sandwiches, wraps and other small items for the hurried customer. Along with "MTGo!", Sheetz unveiled "Shweetz Bakery" items including donuts, fritters and muffins made and delivered daily from the "Sheetz Bros. Kitchen" in Claysburg, Pennsylvania.

Food-only stores
In 2003, Sheetz opened a concept store in the food court of Hanes Mall in Winston-Salem, North Carolina. This location offered Sheetz's made-to-order foods and fountain beverages in a more traditional fast food layout. It did not function as a convenience store. The store has since closed.

In 2012, Sheetz again began contemplating "new concept", "fuel-free" locations. In 2014, a plan was announced to open such a location on the campus of West Virginia University, in Morgantown, West Virginia. The intent was to call it "Sheetz MTO Market", however, when opened, in February 2015, the store was named "Sheetz Café" (although outdoor signage is the same as all other stores).

In September 2015, another no-fuel café opened in State College, Pennsylvania, near the campus of Pennsylvania State University. In Indiana, Pennsylvania, on the border of the Indiana University of Pennsylvania campus, a Sheetz that previously carried gasoline was torn down, and replaced with a no-fuel café that opened in August 2016. A fourth such location opened in September 2017, in Charlottesville, Virginia, directly across the street from the campus of the University of Virginia.

In September 2019, Sheetz announced they would not renew their lease with WVU for that Morgantown location. The company offered no explanation for the closure.

In May 2021, Sheetz announced that the Charlottesville location would close in June.

Alcohol sales in Pennsylvania
Until June 8, 2016, Pennsylvania state law prohibited alcohol sales in convenience stores. Beer had to be sold at a beer distributor while liquor had to be sold at state-operated stores titled "Wines & Spirits". In 2007, Sheetz tried to find a loophole around this by classifying part of one of their prototype stores in Altoona as a restaurant, which would permit alcohol sales. The Malt Beverage Distributors Association of Pennsylvania protested and Sheetz was temporarily barred from selling beer. On appeal, Sheetz was awarded the license to sell beer and continues to do so today. On June 15, 2009, the Pennsylvania Supreme Court gave Sheetz permission to sell beer for takeout under the condition that it is also available to drink on site. Sheetz successfully led the effort to change alcohol sales laws in Pennsylvania to allow sales in convenience and grocery stores, which became law when Governor Tom Wolf signed Act 39 into law on June 8, 2016.

Fuel

The Sheetz stores that sell gasoline offer three grades of gasoline (87, 89, and 93 Octane) and most offer diesel. An increasing number of stores also offer E85 and E15, and some also offer ethanol free gasoline. Some stores offer kerosene at separate pumps.

Sheetz is known for high fuel sales, mostly based on strong inside sales from their MTO's and other products that lead to sales at the pumps. In Pennsylvania, Sheetz is the market leader in all fuel sales at over 21%, ahead of all other competitor convenience store chains including those selling fuel from Big Oil brands such as Exxon, Sunoco, and BP, all of which have a major presence in Pennsylvania alongside Sheetz.

Awards
Silver Plate Award from the International Food Manufacturers Association (2001).
America's Largest Private Companies from Forbes (multiple years).
Best Places to Work from Best Companies Group for Virginia and Pennsylvania (2012–2015)
Best Employers from Best Companies Group for North Carolina and Ohio (2013–2015)
100 Best Companies to Work For from Fortune (2014, 2016–2020)
Alternative Fuels leader of the Year Award from Convenience Store news, for installing flex fuels in North Carolina stores (2015)
Fan-Based Growth Award for adding 102,000 Sheetz Freakz on Facebook and Twitter; Twitter Tweeter Award for most tweets of any convenience store; Award for Encouraging Fan Engagement Creatively and Consistently; all from Convenience Store Decisions (2016)
President's Trophy Award from the American Trucking Associations, for our vehicle safety program, small carrier category (2013)
100 Best Workplaces for Millennials from Fortune (2016)

References

External links

Sheetz

Altoona, Pennsylvania
Retail companies established in 1952
Restaurants established in 1952
Privately held companies based in Pennsylvania
Privately held companies of the United States
Economy of the Eastern United States
Convenience stores of the United States
American companies established in 1952
Automotive fuel retailers
Gas stations in the United States
Fast-food chains of the United States
Companies based in Blair County, Pennsylvania
Retail companies based in Pennsylvania
1952 establishments in Pennsylvania
Family-owned companies of the United States